The Pyrophorini are a New World taxonomic tribe within the Elateridae (click beetle) subfamily Agrypninae. Pyrophorini is a tribe of bioluminescent beetles, and includes such genera as Pyrophorus and Ignelater.

It is believed to be monophyletic.

The tribe Anaissini is very closely related to the Pyrophorini (it includes species formerly placed in Pyrophorini); the latter is exclusively bioluminescent, while the former has only some species that are known to be bioluminescent. Another bioluminescent lineage is Campyloxenus pyrothorax (from Chile) in the related monotypic subfamily Campyloxeninae. The Sinopyrophoridae were thought to represent the first bioluminescent click beetles known from Asia, but actually represent an distantly related novel bioluminescent beetle family.

Genera
Cryptolampros Costa, 1975
Deilelater Costa, 1975
Fulgeochlizus Costa, 1975
Hapsodrilus Costa, 1975
Hifo Candèze, 1882
Hifoides Schwarz, 1906
Hypsiophthalmus Latreille, 1834
Ignelater Costa, 1975
Lygelater Costa, 1975
Metapyrophorus Rosa & Costa, 2009
Noxlumenes Costa, 1975
Nyctophyxis Costa, 1975
Opselater Costa, 1975
Phanophorus Solier, 1851
Photophorus Candèze, 1863
Ptesimopsia Costa, 1975
Pyrearinus Costa, 1975
Pyrophorus Billberg, 1820
Pyroptesis Costa, 1975
Sooporanga Costa, 1975
Vesperelater Costa, 1975

References

Elateridae